Crown Hill Cemetery is a cemetery in Indianapolis, Indiana.

Crown Hill Cemetery may also refer to:

 Crown Hill National Cemetery, a section of Crown Hill Cemetery in Indianapolis
 Crown Hill Cemetery, in Vermilion County, Illinois